The 1936 Minnesota Golden Gophers football team represented the University of Minnesota in the 1936 college football season. In their fifth year under head coach Bernie Bierman, the Golden Gophers compiled a 7–1 record and outscored their opponents by a combined total of 203 to 32. The team was named national champion by eight NCAA-designated major selectors in Associated Press, Billingsley Report, Dickinson System, Dunkel System, Helms Athletic Foundation, Litkenhous, National Championship Foundation, and Poling System. This marked the third consecutive year the team was selected as national champion.

Tackle Ed Widseth was named an All-American by Collier's/Grantland Rice, Associated Press, INS, NEA, New York Sun, Look Magazine, New York Morning Telegram, Hearst, United Press International and Paramount News. Widseth and halfback Andy Uram were named All-Big Ten first team.

Ed Widseth was awarded the Team MVP award.

Total attendance for the season was 247,653, which averaged to 49,531. The season high for attendance was against Iowa.

Schedule

References

Minnesota
Minnesota Golden Gophers football seasons
College football national champions
Minnesota Golden Gophers football